Peter Robert Cleeland (31 May 193816 September 2007), Australian politician, was a Labor member of the Australian House of Representatives, representing the electorate of McEwen in Victoria between 1984 and 1990, and subsequently between 1993 and 1996.

Cleeland was raised in the Melbourne suburb of Preston, earning a trade as a fitter and turner before joining the Victorian Police Force from 1961 to 1969.  While a police officer, he studied and graduated in Law at Monash University. He worked as a solicitor for a number of years, eventually establishing his own practice.  He was elected as a local councillor for the Central Ward in the Shire of Diamond Valley from 1978 to 1985 and was Shire President from 1982 to 1983.

In 1982 Cleeland unsuccessfully stood for election in the Victorian Legislative Assembly seat of Doncaster. He achieved Labor Party preselection for the newly formed federal House of Representatives seat of McEwen, which he won in 1984.  Cleeland won the subsequent election in 1987, before losing the seat to Liberal candidate Fran Bailey in the 1990 general election.  He stood once again in 1993 and won the seat back, serving for a further 3 years before once again losing the seat to Bailey in the 1996 election, when the Keating Labor government was swept from power by John Howard.

Cleeland served as Chairman of the Parliamentary Joint Committee on the National Crime Authority between 1987 and 1990, producing during that time the much cited report "Drugs, Crime and Society". The report recommended harm minimisation rather than criminalisation as a technique for managing illicit drug use.

Cleeland died on 16 September 2007 from motor neurone disease.

References

1938 births
2007 deaths
Australian Labor Party members of the Parliament of Australia
Members of the Australian House of Representatives
Members of the Australian House of Representatives for McEwen
Police officers from Melbourne
Neurological disease deaths in Australia
Deaths from motor neuron disease
20th-century Australian politicians
People from Preston, Victoria
Politicians from Melbourne